Keanu Staude (born 26 January 1997) is a German professional footballer who plays as a midfielder.

Club career
Staude started playing football at FTuS Ost Bielefeld at the age of five and joined Arminia Bielefeld's youth department in 2005. As a 13-year-old, he completed a trial practice at Bayern Munich. For the Arminia U17 team he made 24 appearances in the Under 17 Bundesliga and scored seven goals. He then moved to the U19 side of Arminia, but could not prevent their relegation as bottom of the table from the Under 19 Bundesliga.

On 15 May 2016, Staude made his professional debut for Arminia Bielefeld in the 2. Bundesliga. He came on as a substitute for David Ulm in the last matchday at Karlsruher SC and a provided an assist a few minutes after coming on for the equaliser from Christopher Nöthe. Staude then caused a stir with his two goals in the last two matches of the 2016–17 season. He was also able to build on this performance in the following season. In the meantime he succeeded in asserting himself as an integral part of the squad. On 20 April 2018, Staude made his 50th 2. Bundesliga appearance for Arminia.

On 9 August 2020, after his contract with Arminia had expired as the club had won promotion to the Bundesliga, Staude signed a one-year contract with an option of an extra season with recently promoted 2. Bundesliga club Würzburger Kickers. On 2 January 2021, Staude was released by Würzburger Kickers.

International career
Staude debuted for the Germany U20s in a 1–0 friendly loss to the Italy U20s on 1 September 2016.

Career statistics

Honours
Arminia Bielefeld
 2. Bundesliga: 2019–20

References

External links
 

Living people
1997 births
Sportspeople from Bielefeld
German footballers
Footballers from North Rhine-Westphalia
Association football midfielders
Germany youth international footballers
Arminia Bielefeld players
Würzburger Kickers players
TSV 1860 Munich players
2. Bundesliga players
3. Liga players